Nimbong (also referred to as Nimbong Khasmahal) is a village in the Kalimpong I CD block in the Kalimpong Sadar subdivision of the Kalimpong district  in the state of West Bengal, India.

Geography

Location
 
Nimbong is 78 km from Siliguri and 71 km from Kalimpong. Winters can be severely cold but there is normally no snowfall. During the monsoons, the roads get muddy and there are possibilities of landslides.

Area overview
The map alongside shows the Kalimpong Sadar subdivision of Kalimpong district. This region is characterized by abruptly rising hills and numerous small streams. It is a predominantly rural area with 77.67% of the population living in rural areas and only 22.23% living in the urban areas. While Kalimpong is the only municipality, Dungra is the sole census town in the entire area. The economy is agro-based and there are 6 tea gardens in the Gorubathan CD block. In 2011, Kalimpong subdivision had a literacy rate of 81.85%, comparable with the highest levels of literacy in the districts of the state. While the first degree college in the subdivision was established at Kalimpong in 1962 the entire subdivision (and now the entire district), other than the head-quarters, had to wait till as late as 2015 (more than half a century) to have their first degree colleges at Pedong and Gorubathan.

Note: The map alongside presents some of the notable locations in the subdivision. All places marked in the map are linked in the larger full screen map.

Demographics
According to the 2011 Census of India, Nimbong Khasmahal had a total population of 2,659 of which 1,368 (51%) were males and 1,291 (49%) were females. There were 311 persons in the age range of 0 to 6 years. The total number of literate people in Nimbong Khasmahal was 1,661 (70.74% of the population over 6 years).

Tourism  
It is a quiet and beautiful place in the lap of nature.  “The charm of this place is its complete isolation from the madding crowd of metropolitan life” - it an ideal place for the adventure seeking tourist. There is a lot to see: from snow clad Himalayan ranges to untouched forests and hills all around. There are a variety of food and lodging amenities ranging from comfortable modern facilities to small places with home cooked food.

References

Villages in Kalimpong district